Saint-Jean-de-Marsacq (Gascon: Sent Joan de Marsac or, according to the etymology, Sent Joan de Marçac) is a commune in the Landes department in Nouvelle-Aquitaine in southwestern France.

Population

See also
Communes of the Landes department

References

Communes of Landes (department)